UAM Xochimilco is one of the five academic units of the Universidad Autónoma Metropolitana in Mexico City. UAM Xochimilco is located in the southern portion of the city and was founded on November 11, 1974. It offers 18 undergraduate degrees.

History

UAM Xochimilco began operations on November 11, 1974.

The Unidad Xochimilco is also home to one of the five transmitters of UAM Radio.

Notable people
 Tessy María López Goerne (born 1961), nanotechnologist and academic
 Asa Cristina Laurell (born 1943), former Mexican Under Secretary of Health

References

External links

1974 establishments in Mexico
Universities in Mexico City